Nicolás Alejandro Cabrera (born 5 June 1984 in La Plata, Buenos Aires province) is an Argentine football right winger last played for Quilmes.

Club career 

Cabrera made his professional debut in 2003 for Gimnasia y Esgrima La Plata, while coached by Mario Gómez. He played for the club until 2006, making 71 appearances and scoring 3 goals and playing both Copa Libertadores and Copa Sudamericana. His best season with Gimnasia was the second place obtained in the 2005 Apertura, coached by Pedro Troglio.

In 2007, he was transferred to Racing where he could not establish himself as a regular first team player. For the 2008 Clausura he went to play for Newell's Old Boys and had mostly good performances. However, due to personal problems with Newell's manager, Ricardo Caruso Lombardi, he was left out of the squad.

For the 2008-09 season he was bought by Vélez Sársfield. He played mostly as a starter in the right wing during Hugo Tocalli and Ricardo Gareca's coaching eras, until he suffered a knee injury in the fifth game of the 2009 Clausura (1-0 away victory over Estudiantes de La Plata). Vélez won the tournament, but Cabrera's participation was limited to the first 5 games. He returned the following season, and scored his first post-injury goal in the 4-2 home victory over Racing.

Honours 
Vélez Sársfield
Argentine Primera División (1): 2009 Clausura
Independiente
Copa Sudamericana (1): 2010

External links
 Statistics at Irish Times
   Argentine Primera statistics at Futbol XXI
 Football-Lineups player profile

References

1984 births
Living people
Footballers from La Plata
Argentine footballers
Association football midfielders
Argentine Primera División players
Club de Gimnasia y Esgrima La Plata footballers
Racing Club de Avellaneda footballers
Newell's Old Boys footballers
Club Atlético Vélez Sarsfield footballers
Club Atlético Independiente footballers
Quilmes Atlético Club footballers